Grup d'Elx, is one of the post-World War II artistic movement in Valencia, was founded in Elche in October 1967 by poet Vicente Aguilera Cerní.  The avant-garde group had connections to the Surrealist and Social realism movements and stressed the importance of both the human being and its social entourage.

History 

The Grup d' Elx artists began their training in a precarious artistic scenario. Its activity was a task that built a bridge between modernity and vertebrate and radical vanguard, which for them was inseparable from a social transition out of Francoist Spain. In this sense, as the members of El Paso or Dau al set, the artists of the Grup d' Elx conducted an art in which there are several components that are part of a common denominator: primacy of intense expressiveness, intentional reduction of color to a minimum and, finally, the belief in an artistic poetics of engagement centered on human beings and their social situation. In fact, one of its most representative members, Joan Castejón, was imprisoned for four years.

The group was inspired by the activity of other postwar artistic groups such as Dau al Set and Grup Parpalló. Members of Grup d'Elx included Joan Castejón, Albert Agulló, Antoni Coll y Sixto Marco.

The group dissolved in 1973.

See also
Joan Castejón
Dau al set
Surrealism
Social realism

References

External links
 El País: "El Grup d'Elx regresa tras 27 anys".
 Vilaweb: "El Grup d'Elx ofereix una retrospectiva de la seua obra al Centre d'Art de l'Estació de Dénia".
 Book references Artium about Grup d'Elx.
 Official website of Joan Castejón

Art movements
Avant-garde art
Spanish art
Social realism
Surrealist groups
Spanish surrealist artists